Cyril James Cusack (26 November 1910 – 7 October 1993) was an Irish stage and screen actor with a career that spanned more than 70 years. During his lifetime, he was considered one of Ireland’s finest thespians, and was renowned for his interpretations of both classical and contemporary theatre, including Shakespearean roles as a member of the Royal Shakespeare Company, and over 60 productions for the Abbey Theatre, of which he was a lifelong member. In 2020, Cusack was ranked at number 14 on The Irish Times list of Ireland's greatest film actors.

Born to Irish parents in South Africa and raised in County Tipperary, Cusack dropped out of law school to join the Abbey Theatre and remained with the company for 13 years, acting in over 60 plays. In London, he performed with the Royal Shakespeare Company and the Royal National Theatre, and later founded his own company which toured across Europe. Making his film debut at age 8, Cusack worked with many top British directors, including Powell & Pressburger, Carol Reed, Peter Brook, Peter Hall, and Anthony Harvey. He co-starred opposite Richard Burton several times, who once commended Cusack’s acting as “always himself and yet always totally different.” Fluent in both English and Irish, Cusack had a starring role in the very first Irish-language feature film, Poitín (1978).

He was the patriarch of the Cusack acting family, as the father of Sinéad Cusack, Sorcha Cusack, Niamh Cusack, Pádraig Cusack, and Catherine Cusack.

Early life and education
Cusack was born in Durban, Natal, South Africa. His mother, Alice Violet (née Cole), was an English Cockney actress and chorus girl, and his father, James Walter Cusack, was an Irish mounted policeman in Natal Colony, South Africa. His parents separated when he was young and his mother took him to England, and then to Ireland. Cusack's mother and her partner, Brefni O'Rorke, joined the O'Brien and Ireland Players.

Cyril made his first stage performance at the age of seven. He was educated at Newbridge College in Newbridge, County Kildare, then read law at University College Dublin. He left without a degree and joined the Abbey Theatre in 1932.

Career

Stage 
Between then and 1945, he performed in over 60 productions for the Abbey, particularly excelling in the plays of Seán O'Casey. He also performed in plays by Irish playwright Teresa Deevy Katie Roche and The King of Spain's Daughter. In 1932 he also joined the Gate Theatre company, appearing with them in many notable productions over the years. In 1947, Cusack formed his own company, Cyril Cusack Productions, and staged productions in Dublin, Paris and New York.

In 1963, Cusack joined the Royal Shakespeare Company in London and appeared there for several seasons. By this stage he had established a successful career in films, which had started at the age of eight. The same year, Cusack won a Jacob's Award for his performance in the Telefís Éireann production of Triptych.

Cusack's favorite roles included The Covery in The Plough and the Stars and Christy Mahon in The Playboy of the Western World, which he reprised numerous times.

Cusack's last stage performance was in Chekhov's Three Sisters (1990), in which three of his daughters played the sisters.

Film and television 

Cusack made his film debut in Knocknagow (1918), when he was only 8. His breakthrough role was as a wiry IRA getaway driver opposite James Mason in Carol Reed's Odd Man Out (1947).

Cusack played the titular role in the Galileo (1968), which was the directorial debut of Italian filmmaker Liliana Cavani. Cusack returned to Italy several times throughout his career, particularly in the 1970s, both acting on-camera and working as a voice artist, helping create English-language dubs of Italian films.

Cusack, who was bilingual in English and Irish, had a leading part in the controversial Irish language film Poitín (1977).

He appeared in the 1989 TV adaptation of Roald Dahl's Danny, the Champion of the World alongside his son-in-law Jeremy Irons and his grandson Samuel.

Personal life
Cusack was twice married:
The actress Mary Margaret "Maureen" Kiely (1920–1977), on 5 April 1945
Paul (1946) worked as a producer with RTESinéad (1948) actressSorcha (1949) actressNiamh (1959) actressPádraig (1962) associate producer at the National Theatre in London.
Mary Rose Cunningham (1979–1993)
Catherine (1968) actress

Cusack was a strong supporter of Irish nationalism, and often selected projects based on those beliefs. In later life, Cusack became a campaigner for conservative causes in Ireland, notably in his opposition to abortion, where he became a frequent letter-writer to the main liberal Irish newspaper, The Irish Times.

Regarding his Catholic faith, he commented "Religion promotes the divine discontent within oneself, so that one tries to make oneself a better person and draw oneself closer to God." His religious credentials came under scrutiny following his death and the revelation that he had been unfaithful in his first marriage, with a long-term mistress, Mary Rose Cunningham, who bore him a daughter, Catherine. Cusack married Cunningham following his first wife's death.

Cusack received honorary doctorates in 1977 and 1980 from the NUI and the University of Dublin respectively.

Cusack was a longtime friend of Irish attorney general, Chief Justice and President of Ireland Cearbhall Ó Dálaigh, whom he got to know when they were students at University College Dublin in the early 1930s.

Cusack is the maternal grandfather of Irish Socialist Workers Party TD Richard Boyd Barrett and English actor Max Irons.

Death
In October 1993, Cusack died at home in Chiswick, Greater London, from MND.

Filmography

Films

Television

Theatre credits

With the Abbey Theatre

With the Gate Theatre

With the National Theatre Company

With the Royal Shakespeare Company

Other venues

Notes

References

External links
 
 
 Cyril Cusack at The Teresa Deevy Archive
 Cyril Cusack at Abbey Theatre Archive

1910 births
1993 deaths
20th-century Irish male actors
Alumni of University College Dublin
Cyril
Deaths from motor neuron disease
Irish expatriates in the United Kingdom
Irish male film actors
Irish male soap opera actors
Irish male stage actors
Irish male television actors
Irish people of English descent
People from Durban
Jacob's Award winners
People educated at Newbridge College
Royal Shakespeare Company members
South African emigrants to Ireland